The 1979 Commonwealth Final was the inaugural running of the Commonwealth Final as part of the qualification for the 1979 Speedway World Championship Final to be held at the Silesian Stadium in Chorzów, Poland. The 1979 Final was run on 1 July at the White City Stadium in London, England, and was part of the qualifying for riders from the Commonwealth nations.

Riders from Australia and New Zealand qualified for the new final through the 1979 Australasian Final held at the Rowley Park Speedway in Adelaide, South Australia in February. Those from Great Britain (primarily from England), qualified through the British Championship final held two weeks earlier at the Brandon Stadium in Coventry.

Michael Lee won the event defeating Australian Billy Sanders in a run-off after both riders finished on 14 points.

1979 Commonwealth Final
1 July
 White City Stadium, London
Qualification: Top 9 plus 1 reserve to the Intercontinental Final in London

References

See also
 Motorcycle Speedway

1979
Commonwealth
Commonwealth